Capital Place Jakarta is a mixed development complex at Jalan Jenderal Gatot Subroto in South Jakarta, Indonesia. Capital Place Office Tower is part of the complex, which also occupies by Four Seasons Hotel. The office tower is a 215.1 meter tall, has 48 floors above & 6 floors below the ground.  

The tower tapers as it gets higher, with lower floors offering floor plates of 2,500 sqm. The middle floors are 2,100 sqm and the premium space at the top has a floor-plate of 1,800 sqm. The tower is built environmentally friendly with features include daylight and motion sensors for the interior lighting, such as in the bathrooms and stairwells. The tower is connected with the hotel building by a multilevel retail podium. There are also 1,350 car-park spaces in the complex.

See also
List of tallest buildings in Indonesia
List of tallest buildings in Jakarta

References

Buildings and structures in Jakarta
Skyscraper office buildings in Indonesia
Towers in Indonesia
Buildings and structures completed in 2016
South Jakarta